The Bulgarian Handball Federation (BHF) is the administrative and controlling body for handball and beach handball in Republic of Bulgaria. Founded in 1958, BHF is a member of European Handball Federation (EHF) and the International Handball Federation (IHF).

National teams
 Bulgaria men's national handball team
 Bulgaria men's national junior handball team
 Bulgaria women's national handball team

Competitions
 Bulgarian GHR A

References

External links
 Official website  
 Bulgaria at the IHF website.
 Bulgaria at the EHF website.

Handball in Bulgaria
Handball
Sports organizations established in 1958
1958 establishments in Bulgaria
Handball governing bodies
European Handball Federation
National members of the International Handball Federation
Organizations based in Sofia